

Selwyn's Theatre (1867–1870) of Boston, Massachusetts, was established by British-born actor John H. Selwyn. Architect Benjamin F. Dwight designed the building. Personnel included Dexter H. Follet, Arthur Cheney, H.A. M'Glenen, Charles R. Thorne Jr., and Charles Koppitz. In 1871 Selwyn's was renamed the "Globe Theatre."

Performances
 J. Palgrave Simpson's "Dreams of Delusion"
 William Brough's "The Field of the Cloth of Gold"
 T.W. Robertson's "School"
 Watts Phillips' "Maud's Peril"
 F.C. Burnand and Montagu Williams' "Easy Shaving"
 Pelham Hardwicke's "Bachelor of Arts"
 Falconer's "A Wife Well Won"
 Birch, Wambold, Bernard & Backus San Francisco Minstrels
 "Midsummer Night's Dream," with Morlacchi Ballet Troupe

References

Further reading

External links
 Boston Public Library. Selwyn Theatre: The cast of "Black Eyed Susan", ca.1868
 Bostonian Society. Photo of Essex Street, ca. 1870-90, showing an entrance to Selwyn's Theater on ground floor of Chauncy Hall School
 Boston Athenaeum. Theater History: Selwyn's Theatre (1867-1870), 364 Washington Street.

1867 establishments in Massachusetts
Cultural history of Boston
19th century in Boston
Former theatres in Boston
Boston Theater District
Event venues established in 1867